Cádiz Cathedral is a Roman Catholic church  in Cádiz, southern Spain, and the seat of the Diocese of Cadiz y Ceuta. It was built between 1722 and 1838. The cathedral was declared Bien de Interés Cultural in 1931.

The Plaza de la Catedral houses both the Cathedral and the Baroque Santiago church, built in 1635.

The church was known as "The Cathedral of The Americas" because it was built with money from the trade between Spain and America.
The 18th century was a golden age for Cádiz, and the other cathedral that the city had got, Santa Cruz, was very small for this new moment of Cádiz.
The new cathedral was built from 1722 to 1838. The first person who designed the church was architect Vicente Acero, who had also built the Granada Cathedral. Acero left the project and was succeeded by several other architects. As a result, this largely baroque-style cathedral was built over a period of 116 years, and, due to this drawn-out period of construction, the cathedral underwent several major changes to its original design. Though the cathedral was originally intended to be a baroque edifice, it contains rococo elements, and was finally completed in the neoclassical style. Its chapels have many paintings and relics from the old cathedral and monasteries from throughout Spain.

In the crypt are buried the composer Manuel de Falla and the poet and playwright José María Pemán, both born in Cádiz.

Levante Tower, one of the towers of Cádiz Cathedral, is open to the public and shows panoramas of the city from on high.

Gallery

See also

Roman theatre (Cádiz)

References

Buildings and structures in Cádiz
Roman Catholic cathedrals in Andalusia
Roman Catholic churches completed in 1838
19th-century Roman Catholic church buildings in Spain
Baroque architecture in Andalusia
Bien de Interés Cultural landmarks in the Province of Cádiz
Churches in the Province of Cádiz